"Radio Land" is a song co-written and recorded by American country music artist Michael Martin Murphey.  It was released in August 1984 as the fourth single from The Heart Never Lies.  The song reached #19 on the Billboard Hot Country Singles & Tracks chart.  The song was written by Murphey, Chick Rains and Jim Ed Norman.

Chart performance

References

1984 singles
1983 songs
Michael Martin Murphey songs
Songs written by Michael Martin Murphey
Songs written by Chick Rains
Songs written by Jim Ed Norman
Song recordings produced by Jim Ed Norman
Liberty Records singles